La Vertiente Airport  is an airport serving the pipeline facility at La Vertiente in the Tarija Department of Bolivia.

See also

Transport in Bolivia
List of airports in Bolivia

References

External links 
OpenStreetMap - La Vertiente Airport
OurAirports - La Vertiente Airport
Fallingrain - La Vertiente Airport

Airports in Tarija Department